Zeynekanlu (also Romanized as Zeynekānlū and Zenīkānlū) is a village in Faruj Rural District, in the Central District of Faruj County, North Khorasan Province, Iran. At the 2006 census, its population was 186, in 49 families.

References 

Populated places in Faruj County